

See also
Supreme Court of Chile

References

 
Chile
Lists of Chilean people
Supreme Court